The Japan women's national under-18 volleyball team represents Japan in women's under-18 volleyball events, it is controlled and managed by the Japanese Volleyball Association that is a member of Asian volleyball body Asian Volleyball Confederation (AVC) and the international volleyball body government the Fédération Internationale de Volleyball (FIVB).

Results

Summer Youth Olympics
 Champions   Runners up   Third place   Fourth place

FIVB U18 World Championship
 Champions   Runners up   Third place   Fourth place

Team

Current squad

The following is the Japanese roster in the 2017 FIVB Girls' U18 World Championship.

Head coach: Daichi Saegusa

Notable players

References

External links
Official website
FIVB profile

National women's under-18 volleyball teams
Volleyball in Japan
Volleyball